The Shervashidze Palace is a ruined structure in the village of Lykhny, Gudauta District in Abkhazia/Georgia. The palace was constructed from 16th to the 19th century for Princes Shervashidze, rulers of the Abkhazia.

History 
Palace was destroyed in the course of the revolt against the Russian Empire in 1866. The extant edifice is a remnant of a two-storey building built of limestone, sandstone, brick and other materials.

The Shervashidze palace, built in the 16th or 17th century and reconstructed in the 19th—now in ruins—lies at the outskirts of the Lykhnashta, a large field in Lykhny, where an insurrection against the Russian rule erupted in July 1866. The rebellion was quelled by General Dmitry Sviatopolk-Mirsky, governor of Kutais, and the Shervashidze palace was burned down in August 1866.

Current condition 
Georgia has inscribed the Shervashidze Palace on its list of cultural heritage, but exercises no control over the territory. The current state of preservation of the monument is not known.

References

Palaces in Georgia (country)
Buildings and structures in Abkhazia
House of Shervashidze